Norge is Norwegian (bokmål and riksmål), Danish and Swedish for Norway.

It may also refer to:

People

 Kaare Norge (born 1963), Danish guitarist
 Norge Luis Vera (born 1971), Cuban baseball player

Places
11871 Norge, asteroid

Toponyms:
Norge, Oklahoma
Norge, Virginia

Vehicles
, Danish passenger ship
Norge (airship)
Norge motorcycle, produced by Moto Guzzi
Norwegian watercraft:
, naval ship
, royal yacht

Companies
Norge (appliance manufacturer), part of BorgWarner
Radio Norge, station in Norway
TVNorge, Norwegian broadcaster

See also
Norge Luis Vera (born 1971), Cuban baseball player
Norgay (disambiguation) 
Norway (disambiguation)
Norwegian (disambiguation)